Al-Ittihad Saudi Arabian Club, simply known as Al-Ittihad and also referred to as Ittihad Jeddah, is a professional football club based in Jeddah, Saudi Arabia, founded in 1927. The club spent its entire history in the top flight of football in Saudi Arabia, the Saudi Professional League, and is the second most decorated club in Saudi Arabia. Ittihad means "union" in Arabic.

Al-Ittihad matches are played at Jeddah's main stadium King Abdullah Sports City, which is the second-largest stadium in Saudi Arabia, accommodating 62,345 spectators. Al Ittihad has a long-standing rivalry with Al-Hilal, which is referred to as Saudi El Clasico, and is considered the most prominent and most watched annual match(es) in Saudi football.

It is the oldest sports club still surviving in Saudi Arabia, as the club was founded in 1927. The most successful period in the club history was the 1990s and the 2000s, when the club achieved a large number of titles and achievements domestically, regionally, and even globally culminating in the club securing the 4th place in the 2005 FIFA Club World Championship in Japan.

Al-Ittihad is considered the second most successful Saudi club at domestic and continental level (behind Al-Hilal), as they have achieved the AFC Champions League title twice in a row (one of only three Asian teams to achieve this, and the first to do so), the Asian Cup Winners' Cup once, the GCC Champions League and the Arab Champions League title each once. Domestically, Al-Ittihad is also the second most successful club in Saudi Arabia, having won 8 league titles, 9 King's cup titles, 8 Crown Prince Cup titles, three Saudi Federation Cup titles, and one Saudi Super Cup.

History

Creation (1927–1949) 
The club was founded after a meeting of some of the notable football enthusiasts of the city of Jeddah, on 26 December 1927. They met in the offices of the radio broadcasting company and discussed the idea of forming a football club to compete with various traveling teams and be a source of entertainment for inhabitants and an outlet for the city youth to practice organised sport. Everyone agreed that they should create the team that unites them and Ittihad Jeddah was born. The attendees were Hamza Fitaihi, Fahad Badkook, Abdulsamad Najeeb Alsaady, Ismail Zahran, Ali Yamani, Abdulaziz Jameel, Abdulateef Jameel, Abdulateef Linjawi, Othman Banajah, Ahmad Abu Talib, Ali Sultan, Ahmed Almir and Saleh Salamah. 

The name of club was quoted from this wisdom, Mazen Mohammed words which created the current club name. Club owners agrees with him to put the club name Al-Ittihad (United or Union, jointly) in Arabic.

Ismail Zahran team player who was working as in Radio Office in Jeddah to the possibility of electing the head of the works Mr. Sultan to be a President of the club, However, Ali Sultan became the first official president of the club. Al-Ittihad did not find at first a strong support, there wasn't an official clubs (communities) such as Al Riyadhi, because the presence of powerful culture in the city of Jeddah only. In their first meeting with Al-Riyadhi, Al-Ittihad make it victory with 3–0 won. The club has achieved a historic first tournament, which was called The Cup of Nishan Nazer, counted as an official tournament at the time, The cup have formed a popularity of Al-Ittihad, Because of a challenge between them in the final. Depending on the narrator, the winner can burn the Embassy wood's. The Championship attended by several of the clubs, communities, fought Al-Ittihad where several games to achieve access to the final. with Al-Mukhtalat. The weather was dust, did not complete the first half, the match was stopped about 10 minutes. the referee stopped the game to rest for 8 minutes, the weather was changed for the better with the second half, Al-Mukhtalat squad had led to fail, it was a low attacking level. The most prominent player in the game is the club's defender Safwan which was sacrificed for his team. the club won the championship by 3–0 against Al-Mukhtalat. The most important characteristic of this tournament is the first sporting event held in the reign of the founder King Abdul-Aziz Al-Saud The periods of 1940 to 1950 remained difficult, as the Football Association was not established until 1956.

The Start of The Official Tournaments, The First League Title, The Treble (1950–1999) 
In late 1950s, it is considered as the first club to achieve both the Crown Prince Cup and the King's Cup for two consecutive times.  On 2 May 1960, Al-Ittihad faced their traditional rivals Al-Ahli in the King's Cup, which ended with a big 7–0 victory, which is the largest victory in the derby. The tournament ended and the club became champions for the third time in a row over Al-Wehda, which completed the 1958, 1959, and 1960 series. The club went through its worst period since its founding, after winning the King's Cup in 1967, with the exception of achieving the Saudi Association Cup in 1974, after defeating Al-Hilal on penalties. In the following decade, the Premier League and the First Division were merged due to the many matches of the national team in 1982, which Al-Ittihad won its first league title in its history, which is the first and only club to achieve it. After an absence for 21 years, the club won the King's Cup after defeating Al Ettifaq in 1988.

In mid 1990s, Which is considered as the beginning of the golden age of the club, where a numerous of titles were achieved. In 1996–97, the club delivered a cup treble, winning the Premier League, Crown Prince Cup, and Federation Cup. After two seasons, the club won the league title for the third time in its history after eliminating rivals Al-Hilal in the final 2–0. The first continental championship was also achieved after winning 3–2 over Jeonnam Dragons with a golden goal, scored by Ahmed Bahja. GCC Champions League was also achieved, as the season ended with winning four trophies. In 1999, The club was a runner-up in the Asian Super Cup, after losing 2–3 on aggregate to Júbilo Iwata.

New Century, A Miracle, Two Champions League Titles (2000–2010) 
With the beginning of the new century during the period of president Ahmed Masoud, which is considered one of the most successful periods, winning 8 titles within 3 years. The 1999–2000 league season was achieved at the beginning of the century, after a 3–1 win over Al-Ahli in the final, also, Hamza Idris scored an unprecedented 33 goals, a record in that period, which made him the league's top scorer, and the most scored in a single season. In the following season - the club winning the League for fifth time, and Crown Prince Cup. In the 2001–02 season, on May 1, 2002, Al-Ittihad lost the league final to Al-Hilal, a cross from a corner kick went to Al Hasan Al-Yami, who hit it and the ball entered the goal clearly before Al Hilal's Mohammed Al-Nazhan took it out with his hand. A goal was not awarded by the referee, even as a penalty kick, which in turn ended with a loss 1–2, where the referee was suspended six months after the final - and later apologized, declaring, “I am innocent of your defeat, and God bears witness to that.” The match created a great controversy at all levels, as it faced a lot of criticism, which was considered by many and critics as a “robbery”.

When Ahmed Masoud left the club, Mansour Al-Balawi became president, which is considered by many including the fans as the most prominent and successful period in the club's history. In the 2002–03 season, many players have been brought in, such as Tukar, Saud Kariri, Muhammad Al-Khilaiwi, and Tcheco; who is considered as one of the greatest deals in the club's history, while both the League and the Crown Prince Cup were achieved. Despite leading the league and ending it without a loss, Al-Ittihad lost the league final to Al-Shabab in the championship-playoff finals. In the 2004 AFC Champions League, Al-Ittihad finished the group in first place with only one loss. In quarter-finals, it was successfully passed with a 1–1 draw in Dalian, followed by a home 1–0 victory scored by Tukar, against Chinese Dalian Shide, of which led them to reach the semi-finals. Both matches ended in the last minutes, as Hamad Al-Montashari finished the first leg's 2–1, and Osama Al-Muwallad scored the deadly equalizer in the second leg, with a 4–3 aggregate over Jeonbuk Hyundai Motors, as the club qualified for the final for the first time. The final was out of the ordinary; Al-Ittihad were thrashed at home 1–3 by Korean side Seongnam in the first leg—leading to the sacking of Croatian coach Tomislav Ivić, as assistant coach Dragan Talajić was given the opportunity. Who, in turn, started the return match in Seongnam, Redha Tukar opened the scoring, rising to a ball from a corner kick to score the first goal, Idris scored the second late minute goal in the first half, Mohammed Noor scored the two decisive goals in the second half, before Abushgeer scored the fifth and the last goal. Overcoming the 1–3 loss with a miraculous 5–0 victory, to achieve the first title, Dragan Talajić achievement was unforgettable and almost impossible, this second leg match became one of the most surprising and unforgettable comebacks in AFC Champions League history, which was called "the miracle". Recalling the tournament, Talajić said, “I was initially an assistant to the compatriots Tomislav Ivic, and I learned a lot from him, and I considered the opportunity to work with a great team as a wonderful thing, which is why I agreed to work with him, I was with the team eight months after we arrived at the beginning of the season, and I knew all about the players.” and continued, “I was young at the time, and maybe I was crazy by playing with five strikers, I told everyone before the match that we would win, I always knew we would win, but I didn’t know if the difference would be enough.”

Al-Ittihad achieved its first Arab championship, after defeating Tunisian Club Sportif Sfaxien in the final. On 5 November 2005, Al-Ittihad won the Champions League for the second time in a row, after a 5–3 victory over Al-Ain. Mohammed Kallon, which loaned from AS Monaco, became the top scorer of the tournament with six goals; of which two were in the final—which helped to achieve the second title. Mohammed Noor, was awarded the best player in the tournament. The club remaining as the only to win back-to-back AFC Champions League titles in its current edition. The club qualified for the FIFA Club World Cup for the first time, in the edition that was held in Japan, after achieving the Champions League title—as it became the second Saudi team to qualify for the tournament. On December 11, 2005, Al-Ittihad defeated African champions Al-Ahly after Mohamed Noor’s only goal, to qualify for the semi-finals. Al-Ittihad faced the CONMEBOL champion São Paulo, and it was ended by a 2–3 loss. Al-Ittihad played the match to determine the third place against the Costa Rican club Deportivo Saprissa and lost with a 2–3, were two goals scored by Mohamed Kallon and Joseph-Désiré Job—to end the Club World Cup in the 4th place. Former FIFA President Sepp Blatter expressed his admiration, saying, “In 25 years, I have not seen an Asian team this great.” Ittihad's success is not limited only to football, but also in basketball, water polo, table tennis, volleyball, and swimming, amongst others. In total, Ittihad has won 8,649 trophies. However, football remains the primary sport.

Rivalries

Jeddah Derby

The Jeddah derby between Al-Ittihad and Al-Ahli is known to be one of the most competitive games in the Saudi League. From the start of national competitions both clubs were seen as representatives of two rivals from the same city: Jeddah. This rivalry continued annually for more than 70 years, until Al-Ahli were relegated to the first division in 2022.

Saudi Clasico

Saudi El Clasico, or simply the Clasico, is a long-running competitive match in Saudi football, between Al-Ittihad and Al-Hilal. The competition represents the largest and most important two clubs in the city of Jeddah and the capital, Riyadh, the largest and most culturally prominent cities in the Kingdom of Saudi Arabia. The two clubs are considered the most successful at domestic and continental level. Al-ittihad is the oldest sports club still surviving in the Kingdom of Saudi Arabia, and is seen as the People's Club. While Al-Hilal represents the culture of the Capital Club, it is called by the masses the Leader. The two teams meet twice a year in the league, as they may also meet in the King's Cup or the  Saudi Super Cup or the AFC Champions League. It is considered as the most prominent and most watched match in Saudi football.

The first meeting between the two teams was held on July 27, 1962, a friendly match, in the capital, Riyadh, and ended with a 2-0 victory for Al-Ittihad. The first official meeting between the two teams was on January 10, 1964, the King's Cup Final, which in turn also ended with a 3-0 victory for Al-Ittihad.

Al-Hilal has the largest number of wins in the official meetings that brought the two teams together. The two teams faced each other in 148 official meetings, Al-Hilal won 63, while Al-Ittihad won 50, and the tie occurred in 35 meetings. Together with Al-Nassr, they are the only 3 teams that have not been relegated to the Second Division since its founding.

Present-day

Al-Ittihad is based in Sahafa street, Mushrefa district, in southeastern Jeddah, where they have a large sports complex. Senior teams play official games at the King Abdullah Sports City, north of the city, while youth teams play at the club's headquarters.

In December 2006, the club offered what was thought to be the most lucrative deal in Arabian football to Portuguese midfielder Luís Figo. It was said that Luís Figo will join the club on July 1, 2007, after his current contract with Internazionale expires. However, not long after, Figo's current club, Internazionale released report that Figo had yet to sign a contract with Al-Ittihad and will not be joining. Figo has since extended his contract at Inter until the end of the 2007–08 season citing that the terms of the agreement were not kept and thus voided the contract.

Al-Ittihad sustained a great upset after losing the one-legged 2009 AFC Champions League Final to Pohang Steelers 1-2, as Al-Ittihad entered the knock-out phase undefeated and won the round of 16, quarter-finals, and semi-finals 2-1, 5-1 and 8-3 respectively. According to most Al-Ittihad fans, this unexpected and undeserved loss sparked major distress within the team, as Ittihad fans acknowledged the club's deterioration after this particular defeat. From this loss until 2023 and for 13 years, the club managed to achieve 5 titles only, none of them being league titles, as well as barely surviving relegation a couple of seasons.

Large fanbase
Match attendance-wise, Al-Ittihad has always been the number 1 club in Saudi Arabia, often with a great margin compared to the second place. In the 2014-15 Saudi League, Al-Ittihad's attendance during 12 home games reached a record 550,822 fans (average per match: 42,371), surpassing great clubs like Chelsea, A.S. Roma, and Juventus, despite not winning any trophy that season nor the previous season. In 2016, American website The Sportster ranked Al-Ittihad fans the 12th most influential football fans in the world. Al-Ittihad has built a strong fan-base across Saudi Arabia, amongst the Arab League and in Asia. The club supporters are renowned for being spirited and for their chants. Since its opening on 1 May 2014, Al-Ittihad shares the King Abdullah Sports City Stadium with local rival Al-Ahli, while their previous home the Prince Abdullah Al Faisal Stadium faced construction until it was renovated in 2022.

Sponsorship

Official sponsor
In a press conference on 9 January 2006, president of the club Mansour Albalawi announced that Sela Sport Co (which is the sponsor of Saudi National Team) will pay 350 million riyals to sponsor Al-Ittihad for 5 seasons. Al-Ittihad was later on sponsored by the Saudi Telecom Company, however the team has not renewed STC's contract.

Club statistics

Honours
Al-Ittihad is one of the most of successful clubs in Saudi Arabia, it has 35 official honours, 28 of which are domestic. In addition to their continental successes, the club is one of the only three Asian clubs to have won the AFC Champions League twice in a row.

Records & statistics

Other records
{|class="wikitable" style="text-align: center;"
|-
! style="color:#000000; background:Yellow;"| Season
! style="color:#000000; background:Yellow;"| Div.
! style="color:#000000; background:Yellow;"| Pos.
! style="color:#000000; background:Yellow;"| Pl.
! style="color:#000000; background:Yellow;"| W
! style="color:#000000; background:Yellow;"| D
! style="color:#000000; background:Yellow;"| L
! style="color:#000000; background:Yellow;"| GS
! style="color:#000000; background:Yellow;"| GA
! style="color:#000000; background:Yellow;"| GD
! style="color:#000000; background:Yellow;"| P
!colspan="3" style="color:#000000; background:Yellow;"|Domestic cups
!colspan="2" style="color:#000000; background:Yellow;"|Asia
!colspan="2" style="color:#000000; background:Yellow;"|Other competitions
!colspan="2" style="color:#000000; background:Yellow;"|Top scorer
!colspan="3" style="color:#000000; background:Yellow;"|Manager
|-
|1998–99
| style="background:Gold;"|SPL||1||22||15||3||4||45||32||+13||48
| colspan="2" style="background:Silver;"|CPC
| style="background:Gold;"|PFC
| style="background:Gold;"|ACWC, 
| style="background:Silver;"|ASC
| colspan="2" style="background:Gold;"|GCC
| 
| 
|  Davidovic
|-
|1999–2000
| style="background:Gold;"|SPL||1||22||16||3||3||69||23||+46||51
| colspan="3" style="background:#c96;"|CPC
| colspan=2|
| colspan=2|
|  Hamzah Idris
| 33
|  Oscar
|-
|2000–01
| style="background:Gold;"|SPL||1||22||11||5||6||35||23||+12||38
| colspan="3" style="background:Gold;"|CPC
| colspan=2|
| colspan="2" style="background:Gold;"|EC
| —
| —
|  Ardiles
|-
|2001–02
| style="background:Silver;"|SPL||2||22||15||4||3||59||25||+34||49
| colspan="3" style="background:Silver;"|CPC
| colspan=2|
| colspan=2|
| —
| —
|  Oscar
|-
|2002–03
| style="background:Gold;"|SPL||1||22||15||4||3||53||24||+29||49
| colspan="2" style="background:#c96;"|CPC
| style="background:#c96;"|PFC
| colspan=2|
| style="background:Gold;"|SSC
| style="background:Silver;"|EC
|  Cleberson 
| 8
|  Oscar,  Khalid Al Koroni
|-
|2003–04
| style="background:Silver;"|SPL||2||22||17||5||0||57||15||+42||56
| colspan="3" style="background:Gold;"|CPC
| colspan="2" style="background:Gold;"|ACL
| colspan=2|
|  Mohammed Noor
| 8
|  Tomislav Ivić,  Talajić,  Luka Peruzović
|-
|2004–05
| style="background:#c96;"|SPL||3||22||11||5||6||53||37||+16||38
| colspan="3" style="background:#c96;"|CPC
| colspan="2" style="background:Gold;"|ACL
| colspan="2" style="background:Gold;"|ARCL
|  Sérgio Ricardo Messias Neves
| 13
|  Iordănescu
|-
|2005–06
| style="background:#c96;"|SPL||3||22||11||9||2||47||28||+19||42
| colspan=3 |CPC
| ACL
| Quarter-finals
| colspan=2|
|  Mohamed Kallon
| 12
|  Metsu
|-
|2006–07
| style="background:Gold;"|SPL||1||22||15||3||4||52||25||+27||48
| colspan="2" style="background:Silver;"|CPC
| style="background:Silver;"|PFC
| colspan=2|
| colspan=2|
|  Alhassane Keita
| 21
|  Dimitri
|-
|2007–08
| style="background:Silver;"|SPL||2||22||14||6||2||40||16||+24||48
| colspan="3" style="background:Silver;"|CC
| ACL
| Group Stage
| colspan=2|
|  Magno Alves
| 14
|  Calderón
|-
|2008–09
| style="background:Gold;"|SPL||1||22||17||4||1||57||21||+36||55
| colspan="2" style="background:Silver;"|CC
| style="background:#c96;"|PFC
| colspan="2" style="background:Silver;"|ACL
| colspan=2|
|  Hicham Aboucherouane
| 17
|  Calderón
|-
|2009–10
| style="background:Silver;"|ZPL||2||22||14||3||5||46||30||+16||45
| colspan="3" style="background:Gold;"|CC
| ACL
| Group Stage
| colspan=2|
|  Abdelmalek Ziaya
| 15
|  Calderón,  Enzo Héctor
|-
|2010–11
| style="background:Silver;"|ZPL||2||26||13||12||1||49||23||+20||51
| colspan="3" style="background:Silver;"|CC
| ACL
| Semi-finals
| colspan=2|
|    Naif Hazazi
| 18
|  Manuel José,  Toni,  Dimitri
|-
|2011–12
| ZPL||5||26||10||7||9||49||35||+14||37
| colspan="3" style="background:#c96;"|CPC
| ACL
| Semi-finals
| colspan=2|
|    Hazazi
| 20
|  Kek,  Raul Caneda
|-
|2012–13
| ZPL||7||26||8||9||9||36||36||0||33
| colspan="3" style="background:Gold;"|CC
| colspan=2|
| colspan=2|
|    Fahad Al-Muwallad
|   9
|  Raul Caneda,  Beñat
|-
|2013–14
| ALJ||6||26||8||8||10||45||46||−1||32
| colspan="3" style="background:#c96;"|CC
| ACL
| Quarter-finals
| colspan=2|
|  Mukhtar Fallatah
| 31
|  Beñat,  Amro Anwar,  Juan Verzeri,  Khalid Al Koroni
|-
|2014–15
| |ALJ||4||26||16||4||6||44||33||+11||52
| colspan="3" style="background:#c96;"|CC
| colspan=2|
| colspan=2|
|  Marquinho
| 13
|  Khalid Al Koroni,  Victor Pițurcă
|-
|2015–16
| style="background:#c96;"|ALJ||3||26||15||4||7||54||37||+17||49
| colspan="2" style="background:#c96;"|CC
| style="background:#c96;"|CPC
| ACL
| Group Stage
| colspan=2|
|  Gelmin Rivas
| 24
|  László Bölöni,  Amro Anwar,   Victor Pițurcă
|-
|2016–17
| ALJ||4||26||17||4||5||57||37||+20||52 (-3)
| colspan="3" style="background:Gold;"|CPC
| colspan=2|
| colspan=2|
|  Kahraba 
| 19
|  José Luis Sierra
|-
|2017–18
| SPL||9||26||8||9||9||34||41||-7||33
| colspan="3" style="background:Gold;"|CC
| colspan=2|
| colspan=2|
|  Ahmed Akaïchi 
| 10
|  José Luis Sierra
|-
|2018–19
| MBS||10||30||9||7||14||44||45||-1||34
| colspan="3" style="background:Silver;"|CC
| colspan=2|
| colspan=2|
|    Fahad Al-Muwallad
|   11
| |  Ramón Díaz,   Slaven Bilić,  José Luis Sierra 
|-
|2019-20
|SPL
|11
|30
|9
|8
|13
|42
|41
| +1
|35
|
|
|
|
|
|
|
|   Romarinho
| 13
| José Luis Sierra,  Henk ten Cate,   Fábio Carille
|-
|2020-21
|SPL
|3
|30
|15
|11
|4
|45
|29
| +16
|56
|
|
|
|
|
|
|
|   Romarinho
| 16
| Fábio Carille
|-
|2021-22
|SPL
|2
|30
|20
|5
|5
|62
|29
| +33
|65
|
|
|
|
|
|
|
|   Romarinho
| 20
| Fábio Carille, Cosmin Contra
|}

League records

Performance in AFC competitions
 AFC Champions League: 13 appearances

Top scorers in AFC Champions League

AFC club rankings
Rankings are calculated by the AFC.

Last update: December 1, 2017

Source: Global Football Ranks

Asian record

Players
As of 1 January  2023

Unregistered players

Out on loan

Notable players
Players with senior international caps:

Personnel

Current technical staff

Management

Managerial history
Source:

References

External links
 Eighty years of Al Ittihad
 Eighty years of Al Ittihad
 int.soccerway.com
 Network of Lady fans of Al Ittihad Football Club  Arabic Site
 Al Ittihad Club on Super.ae Arabic Site
 Al Ittihad at the AFC Champions League Official website
 League of the Ittihad Club Fans on the Internet
 Alittihad in Languages  
 Al Ittihad at the Arab Champions League Official website : Arabic – English – Francais

 
Football clubs in Saudi Arabia
Association football clubs established in 1927
1927 establishments in Saudi Arabia
Football clubs in Jeddah
AFC Champions League winning clubs
Asian Cup Winners Cup winning clubs